Junita Irene "Nita" Cunningham (12 February 1939 – 7 February 2015) was a member of the Legislative Assembly of Queensland.  She was first elected in 1998 as the member for Bundaberg. A former minister for Local Government and Planning, her resignation in 2006 due to severe skin cancer triggered the 2006 Queensland state election.

References

1939 births
2015 deaths
People from Bundaberg
Members of the Queensland Legislative Assembly
Australian Labor Party members of the Parliament of Queensland
21st-century Australian politicians
21st-century Australian women politicians
Women members of the Queensland Legislative Assembly